Leslie Lee may refer to:

 Leslie Walter Lee (1896–1948?), American-born farmer and Canadian politician
 Leslie Lee (playwright), black American playwright and former executive producer of the [[Negro Ensemble Company